The Way We Are is an album by the Japanese R&B duo Chemistry, released on November 7, 2001 by Sony Music Japan.

Track listing
 "Intro-lude ~The Way We Are~"
 "合鍵"
 "PIECES OF A DREAM"
 "愛しすぎて"
 "BROTHERHOOD"
 "Point of No Return"
 "C'EST LA VIE"
 "You Go Your Way (Album Version)"
 "Rewind"
 "君をさがしてた ~The Wedding Song~"
 "星たちの距離"
 "Motherland"

External links
 Official Site: Track downloads

Chemistry (band) albums
2001 debut albums